Jean O'Sullivan is an American politician who served in the Vermont House of Representatives from 2011 to 2021.

References

Living people
Goddard College alumni
California State University, Los Angeles alumni
21st-century American politicians
21st-century American women politicians
Members of the Vermont House of Representatives
Women state legislators in Vermont
Politicians from New York City
Politicians from Burlington, Vermont
Year of birth missing (living people)